Physical acoustics  is the area of acoustics and physics that studies interactions of acoustic waves with a gaseous, liquid or solid medium on macro- and micro-levels. This relates to the interaction of sound with thermal waves in crystals (phonons), with light (photons), with electrons in metals and semiconductors (acousto-electric phenomena), with magnetic excitations in ferromagnetic crystals (magnons), etc. Some recently developed experimental techniques include photo-acoustics, acoustic microscopy and acoustic emission. A long-standing interest is in acoustic and ultrasonic wave propagation and scattering in inhomogeneous materials, including composite materials and biological tissues.

There are two main classes of problems studied in physical acoustics. The first one concerns understanding how the physical properties of a medium (solid, liquid, or gas) influence the propagation of acoustic waves in this medium in order to use this knowledge for practical purposes. The second important class of problems studied in physical acoustics is to obtain the relevant information about a medium under consideration by measuring the properties of acoustic waves propagating through this medium.

See also
 Acoustic attenuation
 Acoustic levitation
 Acoustic streaming
 Acousto-electric effect
 Acousto-optics
 Elastic waves
 Interdigital transducer
 Longitudinal wave
 Love wave
 Nonlinear acoustics
 Picosecond ultrasonics
 Sonoluminescence
 Rayleigh wave
 Shear wave
 Sound absorption
 Sound velocity
 Thermoacoustics
 Acoustic radiation force

References

External links
 Physical Acoustics Group, The Institute of Physics (IOP) and The Institute of Acoustics (IOA)
 Anglo-French Physical Acoustics Conferences
 NCPA - National Center for Physical Acoustics, The University of Mississippi

Acoustics